The Oregon Institute of Technology (Oregon Tech) is a public polytechnic university in Oregon with a residential campus in Klamath Falls, Oregon, an urban campus in Wilsonville, Oregon, and additional locations in Salem and Seattle. Oregon Tech provides 32 degree programs in engineering, health technologies, management, communication, psychology, and applied sciences with a total of 37 majors. Almost all students complete externships, co-ops, or other hands-on training inside and outside the classroom.

History
Oregon Tech was founded as the Oregon Vocational School on July 15, 1947, to train and re-educate returning World War II veterans. Under the direction of Winston Purvine, the first classes were held in a deactivated Marine Corps hospital three miles northeast of Klamath Falls. The following year, the school's title was changed to the Oregon Technical Institute. In the first school year, 1947-1948, veterans constituted 98 percent of student enrollment. By 1950, the figure was 75 percent. In that year, in response to the Korean War, the school received a contract for training soldiers in welding and warehouse management. In 1953, Associate degree programs in Surveying and Structural Engineering Technologies were first accredited by the Engineers Council for Professional Development.

In 1954, KTEC, the university's first radio station went on air. By 1953, associate degree programs in the Surveying and Structural Engineering Technologies were first accredited by the Engineers Council for Professional Development. Not long after in 1956, KOTI television opened on campus. However, KOTI is no longer operated on campus. In 1962, the institute was accredited by the Northwest Association of Secondary and Higher Schools. In 1970, the first bachelor's degree programs were accredited by ABET. It would be 25 years later when the first master's degrees were offered. In 1975, the first Geo-Heat Center was established.

The campus was transferred to its current location in 1964, followed by another name change to the Oregon Institute of Technology in 1973. In 2012, the Oregon Institute of Technology officially rebranded to its current name "Oregon Tech". Oregon Tech's four locations in the Portland metropolitan area were consolidated into a single campus in Wilsonville in 2012 at InFocus' former headquarters. By 2015, the Oregon Institute of Technology became an independent public body governed by Board of Trustees.

On April 26, 2021, the university's faculty went on strike after more than 500 days of initial contract negotiations between the faculty union and university administration. This was the first strike conducted by a public university faculty union in Oregon's history.

Campuses
Oregon Tech Klamath Falls, the University Residential Campus
Oregon Tech Wilsonville, the University Urban Campus

Athletics
The Oregon Tech (OIT) athletic teams are called the Owls and Lady Owls (sometimes known as the "Hustlin' Owls"). The institute of technology is a member of the National Association of Intercollegiate Athletics (NAIA), primarily competing in the Cascade Collegiate Conference (CCC) since the 1993–94 academic year.

Oregon Tech competes in 13 intercollegiate varsity sports: Men's sports include baseball, basketball, cross country, golf, soccer and track & field; while women's sports include basketball, cross country, golf, soccer, softball, track & field and volleyball. The mascot for Oregon Tech Athletics is the Hootie the Owl and is a source of pride for many Tech students.

Rivalries
Oregon Tech's traditional athletic nemesis is Southern Oregon University in Ashland, Oregon. The close proximity of the schools and alternate academic foci (science and technology at Oregon Tech, liberal arts at SOU) result in a natural rivalry between the two.

Men's basketball
OIT has won multiple NAIA Men's Basketball Championships. Former men's basketball coach Danny Miles completed his 1,000th win February 1, 2014, in his 43rd year of coaching at OIT. This is the fourth most of any men's college basketball coach all-time (NCAA & NAIA).

Softball
OIT's softball program won the NAIA Softball Championship in 2011.

References

External links
 
 OIT athletics website

 
Public universities and colleges in Oregon
1947 establishments in Oregon
Educational institutions established in 1947